Surakshaa is a 1995 Indian Hindi-language action comedy  film directed and produced by Raju Mavani. It stars Sunil Shetty, Aditya Pancholi, Saif Ali Khan, Sheeba, Divya Dutta and debutant Monica Bedi. Other cast includes Kader Khan, Mukesh Rishi, Tinnu Anand.

Cast
 Aditya Pancholi as Suraj
 Sunil Shetty as Raja
 Saif Ali Khan as Amar / Prince Vijay   
 Monica Bedi as Kiran
 Divya Dutta as Bindiya
 Sheeba as Diana
 Kader Khan as Hotel Manager
 Mukesh Rishi as Jagtap
 Tinu Anand as Dhanraj 
 Arun Bakshi as Laxman Singh
 Achyut Potdar as Vikram Singh

Plot
Suraj is a small-time goon who also does good for people and lives with his girlfriend Diana, trying to make a living by working against criminals, thus making him an enemy of underworld don Dhanraj. Raja is another small-time, good-hearted goon who does what he wants without any regard for cops or criminals, thus falling into Dhanraj's bad books too. And Dhanraj's arch-rival is Jagtap. News one day reaches them that a millionaire Laxman Singh's niece, Kiran is coming from the U.S. and has a ring worth 2.5 million. It is also known that Prince Vijay, nephew of Laxman Singh's closest friend Vikram Singh, is coming from London to marry Kiran.

The criminals soon plot to kidnap Kiran and get the ring as well as money from her. Jagtap approaches Raja, who is otherwise uninterested in this, and offers him 5 million to kidnap Kiran for him, promising him that he won't harm her.

The film now moves to Kiran's hotel, where Amar is seen joining as a waiter, much to the irritation of the comical hotel manager. Raja manages to impress Kiran on her way to the hotel and get a room, and Kiran sees Amar at the hotel and gets highly impressed with his looks. Suraj, in the meantime, captures prince Vijay and goes as an impostor to Kiran's hotel himself. Everyone but Amar and Raja thinks that Suraj is Prince Vijay.

As time passes, Laxman Singh and Vikram Singh arrive at the hotel, and Suraj is exposed. He then confesses that he had only come to the hotel to steal Kiran's ring, and promises to release the real prince Vijay. Amar helps Suraj escape, and then reveals to Suraj that he is the real prince Vijay.

Soundtrack
With Anu Malik's music and Faaiz Anwar's songwriting, "Bam Bam Bam" and "O Mere Sanam" are two tracks of the movie.

References

External links

1990s Hindi-language films
1995 films
Films scored by Anu Malik
Films set in hotels
Indian action comedy films